Knoch School District (before 2022: South Butler County School District)  is a school district located in southern Butler County, Pennsylvania and teaches students from Clinton, Jefferson, Penn, Winfield townships, and Saxonburg Borough.

The board of directors approved renaming the district to Knoch School District effective July 1, 2022.

Four schools make up the school district - Knoch High School (9-12), Knoch Middle School (6-8), South Butler Intermediate Elementary School (4-5) and South Butler Primary School (K-3). These buildings house approximate 2,850 students of the community and employs 279 people: 16 administrative/management personnel, 183 teachers, and 80 support staff.

PA Routes 8, 28, 356 and 228, US Route 422 and Interstates 76 and 79 provide access from Butler (10 minutes) and Pittsburgh (40 minutes).

References

External links
 
 Knoch High School website
 Knoch Middle School website
 South Butler Intermediate Elementary website
 South Butler Primary School website

School districts in Butler County, Pennsylvania